Romuva Cinema is the oldest still operational movie theater in Lithuania. The building was designed by the architect Nikolajus Mačiulskis and was completed on April 13, 1940. In 2015, the building was one of 44 objects in Kaunas to receive the European Heritage Label. The building was reconstructed in 2016–2021, however authentic details from the 1940s have also been preserved.

References

Cinemas in Lithuania
Buildings and structures in Kaunas
Commercial buildings completed in 1940
1940 establishments in Lithuania
Objects listed in Lithuanian Registry of Cultural Property